Tex-Mex cuisine (from the words Texan and Mexican) is a Mexican cuisine that derives from the culinary creations of the Tejano people of Texas. It has spread from border states such as Texas and others in the Southwestern United States to the rest of the country.

Tex-Mex is most popular in Texas and neighboring areas, especially nearby states in both the US and Mexico. It is a subtype of Southwestern cuisine found in the American Southwest.

Common dishes

Some ingredients in Tex-Mex cuisine are also common in Mexican cuisine, but others not often used in Mexico are often added. 

Tex-Mex cuisine is characterized by its heavy use of shredded cheese, beans, meat (particularly chicken, beef, and pork), chili peppers, and spices, in addition to flour tortillas.

Sometimes various Tex-Mex dishes are made without the use of a tortilla. A common example of this is the "fajita bowl", which is a fajita served without a soft tortilla.

Generally, cheese plays a much bigger role in Tex-Mex food than in mainstream Mexican cuisine, particularly in the popularity of chile con queso (often referred to as simply "queso"), which is often eaten with tortilla chips (alongside or in place of guacamole and salsa), or may be served over enchiladas, tamales, or burritos.

Moreover, Tex-Mex has imported flavors from other spicy cuisines, such as in its use of cumin, introduced by Spanish immigrants to Texas from the Canary Islands, but used in only a few central Mexican recipes.

History

However, the cuisine that would come to be called Tex-Mex originated with Tejanos (Texans of Mexican descent) as a mix of native Mexican and Spanish foods when Texas was part of New Spain and later Mexico.

From the South Texas region between San Antonio, the Rio Grande Valley and El Paso, this cuisine has had little variation, and from earliest times has always been influenced by the cooking in the neighboring northern states of Mexico. 

The ranching culture of South Texas and Northern Mexico straddles both sides of the border, where beef, grilled food, and tortillas have been common and popular foods for more than a century. 

A taste for cabrito (kid goat), barbacoa de cabeza (barbecued beef heads), carne seca (dried beef), and other products of cattle culture is also common on both sides of the Rio Grande.

In the 20th century, as goods from the United States became cheap and readily available, Tex-Mex took on such Americanized elements as Cheddar, jack, and pimento cheeses.

In much of Texas, the cooking styles on both sides of the U.S.-Mexico border were the same until a period after the U.S. Civil War. With the railroads, American ingredients and cooking appliances became common on the U.S. side.

A 1968 Los Angeles Times feature wrote "[i]f the dish is a combination of Old World cooking, hush-my-mouth Southern cuisine and Tex-Mex, it's from the Texas Hill Country."

Outside the US 

In France, Paris's first Tex-Mex restaurant opened in March 1983. According to restaurateur Claude Benayoun, business had been slow, but after the 1986 release of the film Betty Blue, which featured characters drinking tequila shots and eating chili con carne, "everything went crazy." According to Benayoun, "Betty Blue was like our Easy Rider; it was unbelievably popular in France. And after the movie came out, everybody in Paris wanted a shot of tequila and a bowl of chili."

Tex-Mex became widely introduced in the Nordic countries and United Kingdom in the early 1990s through brands like Old El Paso and Santa Maria, and very quickly became a staple meal in the Nordics. Minor local variations on Tex-Mex in these areas are to use gouda cheese, or to substitute taco shells with stuffed pita breads. Previously, Tex-Mex had been sold on a limited scale in Stavanger, Norway since the late 1960s.

Tex-Mex has also spread to Canada, where it has become as naturalized as in the United States. The cuisine is also readily found in Argentina, India, Japan, Mexico, the Netherlands, Thailand, and many other countries.

Terminology

The word "TexMex" (unhyphenated) was first used to abbreviate the Texas Mexican Railway, chartered in southern Texas in 1875. In the 1920s, the hyphenated form was used in American newspapers to describe Texans of Mexican ancestry.

The Oxford English Dictionary supplies the first-known uses in print of "Tex-Mex" in reference to food, from a 1963 article in The New York Times Magazine, and a 1966 item in the Great Bend (Kansas) Tribune. 

However, the term was used in an article in the Binghamton (New York) Press in May 1960 and a syndicated article appearing in several American newspapers on October 6, 1960, uses the Tex-Mex label to describe a series of recipes, including chili and enchiladas. 

The recipes included the suggestion of "cornmeal pancakes" in place of tortillas, which at the time were not reliably available to readers outside of the Southwest.

Diana Kennedy, an influential food authority, explained the distinctions between Mexican cuisine and Americanized Mexican food in her 1972 book The Cuisines of Mexico. Robb Walsh of the Houston Press said the book "was a breakthrough cookbook, one that could have been written only by a non-Mexican. It unified Mexican cooking by transcending the nation's class divisions and treating the food of the poor with the same respect as the food of the upper classes." 

The term "Tex-Mex" also saw increasing usage in the Los Angeles Times from the 1970s onward while the Tex-Mex label became a part of U.S. vernacular during the late 1960s, '70s, and '80s. Adán Medrano, a chef who grew up in San Antonio, prefers to call the food "Texas Mexican," which he says was the indigenous cooking of South Texas long before the Rio Grande marked the border between Texas and Mexico.

Influential chefs 
 Felix Tijerina was a successful restaurateur and civic leader who helped pioneer the Tex-Mex cuisine through his dishes.
Born in 1905, Tijerina began working as a busboy at the Original Mexican Restaurant after moving to Houston in 1922. He rose through the ranks and opened his own restaurant, the Mexican Inn, in 1929.
After serving in World War II, Tijerina opened a chain of restaurants named the Felix Mexican Restaurant.
With mildly-spiced dishes and reasonable prices, Tijerina's restaurants catered more towards an Anglo audience. His spaghetti con chile special exemplifies how Tijerina americanized traditional Mexican food to appeal to the local Texans.
Tijerina used his influence and economic profit from the restaurant business to become active in politics. In 1935, Tijerina joined the local council of LULAC (League of United Latin American Citizens), and eventually became the national president of organization, holding the position from 1956 to 1960.
Tijerina died in 1965, but his chain of Felix Mexican Restaurants continued to promote the Tex-Mex cuisine until operations stopped in 2008.
 Josef Centeno grew up in San Antonio, becoming familiar with Tex-Mex cuisine through his Tejano family's cooking.
In 2011, Centeno opened his first restaurant, Bäco Mercat which became an instant success due to the multicultural menu. 
Centeno subsequently opened Bar Amá, then Orsa & Winston which received a Michelin star in June 2019. 
Centeno's most recent Tex-Mex restaurant, Amácita, opened in July 2019.
Centeno has also written two cookbooks: Baco: Vivid Recipes from the Heart of Los Angeles (2017) and Amá: a modern Tex-Mex kitchen (2019).
Centeno has become a leading chef in the Tex-Mex cuisine, receiving praise for both his restaurants and his cookbooks. While the New Yorker listed Centeno's Amá: a modern Tex-Mex kitchen as one of the best cookbooks in 2019, the LA Times named Orsa & Winston as the "Restaurant of the Year" in 2020. His restaurants, the Bar Amá and the Amácita, have been described as “the country's most thoughtful Tex-Mex”.

Related cuisines 
 Mexican cuisine
 New Mexican cuisine
 Southwestern cuisine
 American cuisine
 Texan cuisine

See also

Tex-Mex cuisine in Houston
 List of Mexican restaurants

References

External links

 "Tex-Mex Foods." Handbook of Texas.
 Robb Walsh's Six-Part History of Tex-Mex in the Houston Press: Pralines and Pushcarts , Combination Plates, Mama's Got a Brand-new Bag, The Authenticity Myth, The French Connection, Brave Nuevo World.
 Temples of Tex-Mex: A Diner's Guide to the State's Oldest Mexican Restaurants
 Lieberman, Dave. "Five Ways To Tell You're Eating Americanized Mexican Food." OC Weekly. Monday 14 June 2010.

 
American cuisine
Cuisine of the Southwestern United States
Mexican cuisine
Mexican-American cuisine
Texan cuisine